Magnificent Coloring World Tour was a headlining concert tour by American recording artist, Chance the Rapper, starting at the  CalCoast Credit Union Open Air Theatre in San Diego on September 15, 2016, and ending on November 26, 2016, in Manchester, England. Francis and the Lights served as the opening act.

Tour dates

References

2016 concert tours
Chance the Rapper